Carlos Eduardo Guerrero Zavala (born 14 February 2000) is a Mexican professional footballer who plays as a midfielder.

Honours
Mexico U17
CONCACAF U-17 Championship: 2017

References

External links
 Carlos Guerrero at Mexico national football team
 
 

2000 births
Living people
Association football midfielders
Mexican footballers
Club León footballers
Liga MX players
Sportspeople from León, Guanajuato
Footballers from Guanajuato